Lone Mesa State Park is a closed-access state park in Colorado. It is currently undergoing development and planning. The only allowed use is limited hunting with special permits.

References

State parks of Colorado
Protected areas of Dolores County, Colorado